Valery Bakhno (born 26 June 1971) is a retired Belarusian professional footballer. As of 2015, he is a head coach in Granit Mikashevichi, his hometown club in which he spent the majority of his playing and coaching career. His younger brother Andrey Bakhno is also a former footballer and currently a director in Granit Mikashevichi.

References

External links
Profile at Soccerway
Profile at teams.by

1971 births
Living people
Belarusian footballers
Association football midfielders
Belarusian expatriate footballers
Expatriate footballers in Russia
Expatriate footballers in Poland
Expatriate footballers in Lithuania
FC Yugra Nizhnevartovsk players
FC Shakhtyor Soligorsk players
FC Granit Mikashevichi players
FK Žalgiris players
Belarusian football managers
FC Granit Mikashevichi managers